Paavo Liettu (16 May 1905 – 4 September 1964) was a Finnish track and field athlete who competed in the 1928 Summer Olympics. He was born in Keuruu and died in Tampere.

In 1928 he finished fourth in the javelin throw competition.

External links
Profile, sports-reference.com; accessed 27 February 2018.

1905 births
1964 deaths
People from Keuruu
Finnish male javelin throwers
Olympic athletes of Finland
Athletes (track and field) at the 1928 Summer Olympics
Sportspeople from Central Finland
20th-century Finnish people